Zeig is a surname. Notable people with the surname include:

Jeffrey K. Zeig (born 1947), American psychotherapist, writer, and teacher
Sande Zeig (born 1950), American film director and writer

Jewish surnames